Prentiss Lafayette Walker (August 23, 1917 – June 5, 1998) was an American farmer, businessman, and politician from Mississippi. A staunch segregationist, in 1964 he became the first Republican to be elected to the United States House of Representatives from Mississippi during the twentieth century.

Early life
Walker was born in Taylorsville, Mississippi. He attended public schools in Taylorsville, Mize, and Las Cruces, New Mexico. In 1936, he attended Mississippi College in Clinton.

During World War II, he served in the US Army in the Pacific Theater of Operations. Then, he returned to his previous work as a chicken farmer in Smith County and became president of Walker Egg Farms, Inc., based in Mize. From 1937 to 1963, he was the owner of Walker's Supermarket. In 1960, Walker served on the executive committee of the Mississippi Game and Fish Commission under Governor Ross Barnett.

Political career
He unseated 11-term incumbent W. Arthur Winstead by some 7,000 votes, an 11% margin, the first Republican breakthrough in Mississippi since Elza Jeffords served a term in Congress from 1883 to 1885.

Walker's victory was made possible by two factors. The first was white Mississippians' anger at the national Democratic Party's support for civil rights, which pushed many registered Democrats to vote for Barry Goldwater, who carried Mississippi in the 1964 presidential election with 87 percent of the vote.

The second was widespread suppression of African Americans' right to vote. Only 6.7 percent of eligible Black Mississippians were registered to vote in 1964. In Walker's Congressional district, Goldwater won many of the counties with greater than ninety percent of the vote; two, Holmes and Noxubee, gave him a staggering 96.6 percent, tied for his best showing in the nation, and one which has never since been equalled by any presidential candidate in any county nationwide.

After winning the election, Walker's first public appearance was to speak at a meeting organized by the group Americans for the Preservation of the White Race.

At a Republican fundraiser at the Mississippi Coliseum in the capital city of Jackson on June 20, 1983, US President Ronald Reagan would tell the following anecdote:

Former Congressman Prentiss Walker, who I understand is here today, tells a story about his first campaign. He dropped in on a farm and introduced himself as a Republican candidate. And as he tells it, the farmer's eyes lit up, and then he said, "Wait till I get my wife. We've never seen a Republican before."

And a few minutes later he was back with his wife, and they asked Prentiss if he wouldn't give them a speech. Well, he looked around for kind of a podium, something to stand on, and then the only thing available was a pile of that stuff that the late Mrs. Truman said it had taken her thirty-five years to get Harry to call "fertilizer."

So, he stepped up on that and made his speech. And apparently he won them over. And they told him it was the first time they'd ever heard a Republican. And he says, "That's okay. That's the first time I've ever given a speech from a Democratic platform."

Walker relinquished his House seat after only one term. He instead challenged U.S. Senator James Eastland. He ran well to Eastland's right and accused the veteran senator of being too friendly with US President Lyndon Johnson and of not doing enough to block integration-friendly judges in his position as chairman of the Senate Judiciary Committee.

With 105,652 votes, Walker polled 26.7 percent at the general election. His supporters included blacks in southwestern Mississippi, which came as a surprise because of Walker's open support for segregation. Black voters had entered the political process under the Voting Rights Act of 1965 and carried Claiborne and Jefferson Counties for Walker in protest of Eastland as a "Democratic Regular."

Years later, Wirt Yerger, the chairman of the Mississippi Republican Party in the 1960s, noted that Walker's decision to relinquish his House seat after one term for the vagaries of a Senate race against the powerful Eastland was "very devastating" to the growth of the Republican Party in Mississippi.

In 1966, state Representative Lewis McAllister of Meridian, the first Republican elected to the Mississippi House of Representatives since Reconstruction, sought to hold Walker's House seat for the Republican, but victory went to fellow State Representative Gillespie V. "Sonny" Montgomery, also of Meridian, who held the seat for 30 years. Walker tried to unseat Montgomery in 1968 but got only thirty percent of the vote. When Walker again ran for the Senate against Eastland in 1972, as an Independent, rather than a Republican, he drew only 14,662 votes (2.3 percent). The Rockefeller-style Republican Gil Carmichael, a former critic of Walker, trailed with 249,779 votes (38.7 percent), as Eastland won handily with 375,102 votes or 58.1 percent.

Private life
Walker and his wife, the former Dimple Howell (1919-2013), the last surviving of six children of the former Emily Dorilla Johnson (1880-1977) and John Fleming Howell (1882-1967), had two daughters, Treta Walker Butler and husband James of Mize and Jan Walker Magee of Magee. Prentiss and Dimple Walker are interred in Mize at Zion Hill Missionary Baptist Church Cemetery.

Legacy
Prentiss Walker Lake (originally called Ross Barnett Lake) near Mize is named in his honor.

Sources
 "G.O.P. Threatened in South by Loss of Backlash Vote," October 9, 1966; ProQuest Historical Newspapers, The New York Times (18512003)

References

External links

Sid Salter: "Smith County congregation sends a Republican delegate every 40 years", Jackson Clarion Ledger, August 30, 2004.

1917 births
1998 deaths
American grocers
United States Army personnel of World War II
Burials in Mississippi
Businesspeople from Mississippi
Farmers from Mississippi
Mississippi College alumni
Mississippi Independents
People from Simpson County, Mississippi
People from Taylorsville, Mississippi
Politicians from Las Cruces, New Mexico
Republican Party members of the United States House of Representatives from Mississippi
United States Army soldiers
20th-century American businesspeople
20th-century American politicians
New Right (United States)